Faxonius holti, the bimaculate crayfish, is a species of crayfish in the family Cambaridae. It is endemic to Alabama where it occurs in a limited portion of the lower Tombigbee and central Alabama drainages.

References

Cambaridae
Fauna of the United States
Endemic fauna of Alabama
Freshwater crustaceans of North America
Crustaceans described in 1980
Taxa named by Horton H. Hobbs Jr.
Taxobox binomials not recognized by IUCN